The Vevey–Chardonne–Mont Pèlerin funicular railway (VCP) is a funicular which runs between Vevey, a town on the north shore of Lake Geneva in the canton of Vaud, through the Chardonne vineyards of Lavaux to Mont Pèlerin.

The line was constructed in 1899 and opened the following year. It is a single track of ) with a passing point but is unusual in that it has three intermediate halts (Corseaux, Chardonne and la Baume). Construction was by the Doppelmayr Von Roll consortium. Nowadays, the line, which is electrically operated, is automatic, with a journey time of 10 minutes.

The operating company became part of the Transports Montreux-Vevey-Riviera (MVR) in 2001 and is now marketed by the MOB (Montreux-Oberland Bernois) company under their GoldenPass services banner.

Refurbishment 
In the summer of 2009, the line was closed for major infrastructure work to be carried out and at the same time the two carriages refurbished and rebranded in "Golden Pass" livery. The work, which was completed by 25 September 2009, and which involved the technical services of the Golden Pass group together with private enterprise cost just over CHF 4.8 million. During the work a replacement bus service was provided (as far as possible) to cover for the funicular journeys. The Golden Pass identity for the funicular, it is hoped, will give it more of a national and international naming and it is hoped will bring in more visitors through this branding. The new colours of the carriages will be applied to other funiculars in the Golden Pass Group as well as buses and trains, other than the Golden Pass Panoramic and Golden Pass Classic which they operate.

Access 
The lower terminus (Vevey-Funiculaire terminus) of the line is served by the Riviera trolleybus system, specifically line 201 of VMCV.

Further reading

See also 
 List of funicular railways
 List of funiculars in Switzerland

References

External links 
 
 Funimag-article: VCP - Vevey Mont Pélerin

Funicular railways in Switzerland
Defunct railway companies of Switzerland
Transport in the canton of Vaud
Funicular
Metre gauge railways in Switzerland
Railway lines opened in 1900